Władziu Valentino Liberace (May 16, 1919 – February 4, 1987) was an American pianist, singer, and actor. A child prodigy born in Wisconsin to parents of Italian and Polish origin, he enjoyed a career spanning four decades of concerts, recordings, television, motion pictures, and endorsements. At the height of his fame from the 1950s to 1970s, he was the highest-paid entertainer in the world with established concert residencies in Las Vegas and an international touring schedule. He embraced a lifestyle of flamboyant excess both on and off stage.

Early life and education
Władziu Valentino Liberace (known as "Lee" to his friends and "Walter" to family) was born in West Allis, Wisconsin, on May 16, 1919. His father, Salvatore ("Sam") Liberace (1885–1977), was an immigrant from Formia in the Lazio region of central Italy. His mother, Frances Zuchowski (1892–1980), was born in Menasha, Wisconsin, of Polish descent. Liberace had an identical twin who died at birth. He had three surviving siblings: a brother George (who was a violinist), a sister Angelina, and younger brother Rudy (Rudolph Valentino Liberace, named after the actor due to his mother's interest in show business).

Liberace's father played the French horn in bands and cinemas but often worked as a factory worker or laborer. While Sam encouraged music in his family, his wife, Frances (despite having been a concert pianist before her marriage), believed music lessons and a record player to be unaffordable luxuries. This caused family disputes. Liberace later stated, "My dad's love and respect for music created in him a deep determination to give as his legacy to the world, a family of musicians dedicated to the advancement of the art."

Liberace began playing the piano at the age of four. While Sam took his children to concerts to further expose them to music, he was  a taskmaster demanding high standards from the children in both practice and performance. Liberace's prodigious talent was evident from his early years. By the age of seven, he was capable of memorizing difficult pieces. He studied the technique of the Polish pianist Ignacy Jan Paderewski. At the age of eight, he actually met Paderewski backstage after a concert at the Pabst Theater in Milwaukee. "I was intoxicated by the joy I got from the great virtuoso's playing", Liberace said later. "My dreams were filled with fantasies of following his footsteps....Inspired and fired with ambition, I began to practice with a fervour that made my previous interest in the piano look like neglect." Paderewski later became a family friend as well as Liberace's mentor, to whom the protege never missed any opportunities to pay tribute.

The Depression was financially hard on the Liberace family. In childhood, Liberace suffered from a speech impediment, and as a teen, from the taunts of neighborhood children, who mocked him for his effeminate personality, his avoidance of sports, and his fondness for cooking and the piano. Liberace concentrated on his piano playing with the help of music teacher Florence Kelly, who oversaw Liberace's musical development for 10 years. He gained experience playing popular music in theaters, on local radio, for dancing classes, for clubs, and for weddings.

In 1934, he played jazz piano with a school group called "The Mixers" and later with other groups. Liberace  performed in cabarets and strip clubs. Though Sam and Frances did not approve, their son was earning a living during hard times. For a while, Liberace adopted the stage name "Walter Busterkeys". He  showed an interest in draftsmanship, design, and painting, and became a fastidious dresser and follower of fashion. By this time, he was already displaying a penchant for turning eccentricities into attention-getting practices, and earned popularity at school, despite some making him an object of ridicule.

Career

Early career
 
A participant in a formal classical music competition in 1937, Liberace was praised for his "flair and showmanship". At the end of a traditional classical concert in La Crosse in 1939, Liberace played his first requested encore, the popular comedy song "Three Little Fishies". He later stated that he played the popular tune in the styles of several different classical composers. The 20-year-old played with the Chicago Symphony Orchestra on January 15, 1940 at the Pabst Theater in Milwaukee, performing Liszt's Second Piano Concerto under the baton of Hans Lange, for which he received strong reviews. He also toured in the Midwest.

Between 1942 and 1944, Liberace moved away from straight classical performance and reinvented his act to one featuring "pop with a bit of classics" or as he  called it "classical music with the boring parts left out". In the early 1940s, he struggled in New York City, but by the mid- and late-1940s, he was performing in night clubs in major cities around the United States and "gained national exposure through his performance contracts with the Statler and Radisson hotel chains", largely abandoning the classical music altogether. He changed from a classical pianist to an entertainer and showman, unpredictably and whimsically mixing the serious with light fare, e.g., Chopin with "Home on the Range".

For a while, he played piano along with a phonograph  on stage. The gimmick helped gain him attention. He  added interaction with the audience—taking requests, talking with the patrons, making jokes, giving lessons to chosen audience members. He  began to pay greater attention to such details as staging, lighting, and presentation. The transformation to entertainer was driven by Liberace's desire to connect directly with his audiences, and secondarily from the reality of the difficult competition in the classical piano world.

In 1943, he began to appear in Soundies (the 1940s precursor to music videos). He recreated two flashy numbers from his nightclub act, the standards "Tiger Rag" and "Twelfth Street Rag". In these films, he was billed as Walter Liberace. Both "Soundies" were later released to the home-movie market by Castle Films. In 1944, he made his first appearances in Las Vegas, which later became his principal venue.

He was playing at the best clubs, finally appearing at the Persian Room in 1945, with Variety proclaiming, "Liberace looks like a cross between Cary Grant and Robert Alda. He has an effective manner, attractive hands which he spotlights properly, and withal, rings the bell in the dramatically lighted, well-presented, showmanly routine. He should snowball into box office." The Chicago Times was similarly impressed: He "made like Chopin one minute and then turns on a Chico Marx bit the next."

During this time, Liberace worked to refine his act. He added the candelabrum as his trademark, inspired by a similar prop in the Chopin biopic A Song to Remember (1945). He adopted "Liberace" as his stage name, making a point in press releases that it was pronounced "Liber-Ah-chee". He wore white tie and tails for better visibility in large halls. Besides clubs and occasional work as an accompanist and rehearsal pianist, Liberace played for private parties, including those at the Park Avenue home of millionaire oilman J. Paul Getty. By 1947, he was billing himself as "Liberace—the most amazing piano virtuoso of the present day."

He had to have a piano to match his growing presence, so he bought a rare, oversized, gold-leafed Blüthner Grand, which he hyped up in his press kit as a "priceless piano". Later, he performed with an array of extravagant, custom-decorated pianos, some encrusted with rhinestones and mirrors. He moved to the Los Angeles neighborhood of North Hollywood in 1947 and was performing at local clubs, such as Ciro's and The Mocambo, for stars such as Rosalind Russell, Clark Gable, Gloria Swanson, and Shirley Temple. He did not always play to packed rooms, and he learned to perform with extra energy to thinner crowds, to maintain his own enthusiasm.

Liberace created a publicity machine which helped to make him a star. Despite his success in the supper-club circuit, where he was often an intermission act, his ambition was to reach larger audiences as a headliner and a television, movie, and recording star. Liberace began to expand his act and made it more extravagant, with more costumes and a larger supporting cast. His large-scale Las Vegas act became his hallmark, expanding his fan base, and making him wealthy.

His New York City performance at Madison Square Garden in 1954, which earned him a record $138,000 for one performance, was more successful than the great triumph his idol Paderewski had made 20 years earlier. He was mentioned as a sex symbol in The Chordettes 1954 No. 1 hit "Mr. Sandman". By 1955, he was making $50,000 per week (equal to $ today) at the Riviera Hotel and Casino in Las Vegas and had over 200 official fan clubs with a quarter of a million members. He was making over $1 million per year from public appearances, and millions from television. Liberace was frequently covered by the major magazines, and he became a pop-culture superstar, but he  became the butt of jokes by comedians and the public.

Liberace appeared on the March 8, 1956 episode of the TV quiz program You Bet Your Life hosted by Groucho Marx.

Music critics were generally harsh in their assessment of his piano playing. Critic Lewis Funke wrote after the Carnegie Hall concert, Liberace's music "must be served with all the available tricks, as loud as possible, as soft as possible, and as sentimental as possible. It's almost all showmanship topped by whipped cream and cherries." Even worse, to said critics, was his apparent lack of reverence and fidelity to the great composers. "Liberace recreates—if that is the word—each composition in his own image. When it is too difficult, he simplifies it. When it is too simple, he complicates it." They referred to his as "sloppy technique" that included "slackness of rhythms, wrong tempos, distorted phrasing, an excess of prettification and sentimentality, a failure to stick to what the composer has written."

Liberace once stated, "I don't give concerts, I put on a show." Unlike the concerts of classical pianists which normally ended with applause and a retreat off-stage, Liberace's shows ended with the public invited on-stage to touch his clothes, piano, jewelry, and hands. Kisses, handshakes, hugs, and caresses usually followed. A critic summed up his appeal near the end of Liberace's life: "Mr. Showmanship has another more potent, drawing power to his show: the warm and wonderful way he works his audience. Surprisingly enough, behind all the glitz glitter, the corny false modesty, and the shy smile, Liberace exudes a love that is returned to him a thousand-fold."

Early television work and The Liberace Show

Liberace mostly bypassed radio before trying a television career, thinking radio unsuitable given his act's dependency on the visual. Despite his enthusiasm about the possibilities of television, Liberace was disappointed after his early guest appearances on CBS's The Kate Smith Show, and DuMont's Cavalcade of Stars, with Jackie Gleason (later The Jackie Gleason Show on CBS). Liberace was particularly displeased with the frenetic camera work and his short appearance time. He soon wanted his own show where he could control his presentation as he did with his club shows.

His first show on local television in Los Angeles was a smash hit, earning the highest ratings of any local show, which he parlayed into a sold-out appearance at the Hollywood Bowl. That led to a summer replacement program for Dinah Shore.

The 15-minute network television program, The Liberace Show, began on July 1, 1952, but did not lead to a regular network series. Instead, producer Duke Goldstone mounted a filmed version of Liberace's local show performed before a live audience for syndication in 1953 and sold it to scores of local stations. The widespread exposure of the syndicated series made the pianist more popular and prosperous than ever. His first two years' earnings from television netted him $7 million and on future reruns, he earned up to 80% of the profits.

Liberace learned early on to add "schmaltz" to his television show and to cater to the tastes of the mass audience by joking and chatting to the camera as if performing in the viewer's own living room. He  used dramatic lighting, split images, costume changes, and exaggerated hand movements to create visual interest. His television performances featured enthusiasm and humor.

Liberace  employed "ritualistic domesticity", used by such early TV greats as Jack Benny and Lucille Ball. His brother George often appeared as guest violinist and orchestra director, and his mother was usually in the front row of the audience, with brother Rudy and sister Angelina often mentioned to lend an air of "family". Liberace began each show in the same way, then mixed production numbers with chat, and signed off each broadcast softly singing "I'll Be Seeing You", which he made his theme song. His musical selections were broad, including classics, show tunes, film melodies, Latin rhythms, ethnic songs, and boogie-woogie.

The show was so popular with his mostly female television audience, he drew over 30 million viewers at any one time and received 10,000 fan letters per week. His show was  one of the first to be shown on British commercial television in the 1950s, where it was broadcast on Sunday afternoons by Lew Grade's Associated TeleVision. This exposure gave Liberace a dedicated following in the United Kingdom. Gay men  found him appealing. According to author Darden Asbury Pyron, "Liberace was the first gay person Elton John had ever seen on television; he became his hero."

After The Liberace Show

In 1956, Liberace had his first international engagement, playing successfully in Havana, Cuba. He followed up with a European tour later that year. Always a devout Catholic, Liberace considered his meeting with Pope Pius XII a highlight of his life. In 1960, Liberace performed at the London Palladium with Nat King Cole and Sammy Davis Jr. (this was the first televised "command performance", now known as the Royal Variety Performance, for Queen Elizabeth II).

On July 19, 1957, hours after Liberace gave a deposition in his $25 million libel suit against Confidential magazine, two masked intruders attacked his mother in the garage of Liberace's home in Sherman Oaks. She was beaten and kicked, but her heavy corset may have protected her from being badly injured. Liberace was not informed about the assault until he finished his midnight show at the Moulin Rouge nightclub. Guards were hired to watch over Liberace's house and the houses of his two brothers.

Despite successful European tours, his career had in fact been slumping since 1957, but Liberace built it back up by appealing directly to his fan base. Through live appearances in small-town supper clubs, and with television and promotional appearances, he began to regain popularity. On November 22, 1963, he suffered kidney failure, reportedly from accidentally inhaling excessive amounts of dry cleaning fumes from his newly cleaned costumes in a Pittsburgh dressing room, and nearly died. He later said that what saved him from further injury was being woken up by his entourage to the news that John F. Kennedy had been assassinated. Told by doctors that his condition was fatal, he began to spend his entire fortune by buying extravagant gifts of furs, jewels, and even a house for friends, but then recovered after a month.

Re-energized, Liberace returned to Las Vegas, and upping the glamor and glitz, he took on the sobriquet "Mr. Showmanship". As his act swelled with spectacle, he famously stated, "I'm a one-man Disneyland." The costumes became more exotic (ostrich feathers, mink, capes, and huge rings), entrances and exits more elaborate (chauffeured onstage in a Rolls-Royce or dropped in on a wire like Peter Pan), choreography more complex (involving chorus girls, cars, and animals), and the novelty acts especially talented, with juvenile acts including Australian singer Jamie Redfern and Canadian banjo player Scotty Plummer. Barbra Streisand was the most notable new adult act he introduced, appearing with him early in her career.

Liberace's energy and commercial ambitions took him in many directions. He owned an antiques store in Beverly Hills, California, and a restaurant in Las Vegas for many years. He even published cookbooks, the most famous of these being Liberace Cooks, co-authored by cookbook guru Carol Truax, which included "Liberace Lasagna" and "Liberace Sticky Buns". The book features recipes "from his seven dining rooms" (of his Hollywood home).

Liberace's live shows during the 1970s–80s remained major box-office attractions at the Las Vegas Hilton and Lake Tahoe, where he earned $300,000 a week.

In 1970, Liberace competed against Irish actor Richard Harris for the purchase of the Tower House in Holland Park, west London. Harris eventually bought the house after discovering that Liberace had agreed to buy it, but had not yet put down a deposit. British entertainer Danny La Rue visited The Tower House with Liberace and later recounted in his autobiography a paranormal experience that he had there with him.

Later television work
Liberace  made significant appearances on other shows such as The Ed Sullivan Show, The Ford Show, Starring Tennessee Ernie Ford, Edward R. Murrow's Person to Person, and on the shows of Jack Benny and Red Skelton, on which he often parodied his own persona. A new Liberace Show premiered on ABC's daytime schedule in 1958, featuring a less flamboyant, less glamorous persona, but it failed in six months, as his popularity began slumping.

Liberace received a star on the Hollywood Walk of Fame in 1960 for his contributions to the television industry. He continued to appear on television as a frequent and welcomed guest on The Tonight Show with Jack Paar in the 1960s, with memorable exchanges with Zsa Zsa Gabor and Muhammad Ali, and later with Johnny Carson.

He was  Red Skelton's 1969 CBS summer replacement with his own variety hour, taped in London. Skelton and Lew Grade's production companies co-produced this program. In a cameo on The Monkees, he appeared at an avant-garde art gallery as himself, gleefully smashing a grand piano with a sledgehammer as Mike Nesmith looked on and cringed in mock agony.

In the Batman television series in 1966 with Adam West and Burt Ward, Liberace played a dual role as concert pianist Chandell and his gangster-like twin Harry, who was extorting Chandell into a life of crime as "Fingers", in the episodes "The Devil's Fingers" and "The Dead Ringers", both written by Lorenzo Semple Jr., who developed Batman for television. The episodes of this two-part story were, according to Joel Eisner's The Official Batman Batbook, the highest-rated of all the show's episodes.

His subsequent television appearances included episodes of Here's Lucy (1970), Kojak, and The Muppet Show (both 1978), all as himself. His performances in the last of these included a "Concerto for the Birds", "Misty", "Five Foot Two", and a rendition of "Chopsticks". Television specials were made from Liberace's show at the Las Vegas Hilton in 1978-79 which were broadcast on CBS.

In the 1980s, he guest-starred on television shows such as Saturday Night Live (on a 10th season episode hosted by Hulk Hogan and Mr. T), and the 1984 film Special People. In 1985, he appeared at the first WrestleMania as the guest timekeeper for the main event.

Films

Even before his arrival in Hollywood in 1947, Liberace wanted to add acting to his list of accomplishments. His exposure to the Hollywood crowd through his club performances led to his first movie appearance in Universal's South Sea Sinner (1950), a tropical island drama starring MacDonald Carey and Shelley Winters, in which he was 14th-billed as "a Hoagy Carmichael sort of character with long hair". Liberace  appeared as a guest star in two compilation features for RKO Radio Pictures. Footlight Varieties (1951) is an imitation-vaudeville hour and a little-known sequel, Merry Mirthquakes (1953), featured Liberace as master of ceremonies.

In 1955, Liberace was at the height of his career when tapped by Warner Bros. for his first starring motion picture, Sincerely Yours (1955), a remake of The Man Who Played God (1932), as a concert pianist who turns his efforts toward helping others when his career is cut short by deafness. In April 1955, Modern Screen magazine claimed Doris Day had been most often mentioned as Liberace's leading lady, "but it is doubtful that Doris will play the role. Liberace's name alone will pack theatres and generous Liberace would like to give a newcomer a break." (Joanne Dru, an established movie actress, was the leading lady.) When Sincerely Yours was released in November, the studio mounted an ad and poster campaign with Liberace's name in huge, eccentric, building-block letters above and much larger than the title. "Fabulously yours in his first starring motion picture!" was a tag line. The other players and staff were smallish at the bottom. The film was a critical and commercial failure since Liberace proved unable to translate his eccentric on-stage persona to that of a movie leading man. Warner quickly issued a pressbook ad supplement with new "Starring" billing below the title, in equal plain letters: "Liberace, Joanne Dru, Dorothy Malone". TCM's Robert Osborne recalls a more dramatic demotion: When Sincerely Yours played first run at the Orpheum in Seattle, the billing was altered even more: Joanne Dru, Dorothy Malone, and Alex Nicol above the title (with big head shots of all three) and below the title in much smaller letters: "with Liberace at the piano". Originally, Sincerely Yours was meant to be the first of a two-picture movie contract, but it proved a massive box-office flop. The studio then bought back the contract, effectively paying Liberace not to make a second movie.

The experience left Liberace so shaken that he largely abandoned his movie aspirations. He made two more big-screen appearances, but only in cameo roles. These were When the Boys Meet the Girls (1965), starring Connie Francis, where Liberace essentially played himself. He received kudos for his brief appearance as a casket salesman in The Loved One (1965), based on Evelyn Waugh's satire of the funeral business and movie industry in Southern California.

Recordings
The massive success of Liberace's syndicated television show was the main impetus behind his record sales. From 1947 to 1951, he recorded 10 discs. By 1954, it jumped to nearly 70. He released several recordings through Columbia Records including Liberace by Candlelight (later on Dot and through direct television advertising) and sold over 400,000 albums by 1954. His most popular single was "Ave Maria", selling over 300,000 copies. His theme song was "I'll Be Seeing You", which he would customarily sing rather than play on any of his various pianos.

His albums included pop standards of the time, such as "Hello, Dolly!", and  included his interpretations of the classical piano repertoire such as Chopin and Liszt, although many fans of classical music widely criticized them (as well as Liberace's skills as a pianist in general) for being "pure fluff with minimal musicianship". In his life, he received six gold records.

Final appearances

Liberace's final stage performance was at New York's Radio City Music Hall on November 2, 1986; it was his 18th show over a tour of 21 days (from October 16), and the concert series grossed just over $2.5 million at the theater box office. His final television appearance was on Christmas Day that same year on The Oprah Winfrey Show, which had actually been videotaped in Chicago over one month earlier.

Personal life

Liberace was conservative in his political and religious beliefs. He believed fervently in capitalism and was  fascinated with royalty, ceremony, and luxury. He loved to socialize and was fascinated by the rich and famous. However, he still presented himself to his fans as one of them, a Midwesterner who had earned his success through hard work, and who invited them to enjoy it with him.

In the later years of his life, having earned sudden wealth, Liberace spent lavishly, displaying extravagant materialism in his life and his act. In 1953, he designed and built his first celebrity house in Sherman Oaks, California on Valley Vista Blvd., located in the San Fernando Valley region of Los Angeles. The house featured a piano theme throughout, including a piano-shaped swimming pool which remains today. His dream home, with its lavish furnishings, elaborate bath, and antiques, added to his image. He leveraged his fame through hundreds of promotional tie-ins with banks, insurance companies, automobile companies, food companies, and even morticians. Liberace was an experienced pitchman and relied on the support of his vast audience of housewives. Sponsors sent him complimentary products, including his white Cadillac limousine, and he reciprocated enthusiastically: "If I am selling tuna fish, I believe in tuna fish."

Others criticized his flashy but proficient piano playing, his non-stop promotions, and his gaudy display of success. Outwardly, he remained undeterred, once sending a letter to a critic, "Thank you for your very amusing review. After reading it, in fact, my brother George and I laughed all the way to the bank." He responded similarly to subsequent poor reviews, famously modifying it to "I cried all the way to the bank." In an appearance on The Tonight Show some years later, Liberace retold the anecdote to Johnny Carson, and finished by saying, "I don't cry all the way to the bank any more – I  the bank!"

Lawsuits and allegations of homosexuality

Liberace's fame in the United States was matched for a time in the United Kingdom. In 1956, an article in the Daily Mirror by columnist Cassandra (William Connor) described Liberace as "the summit of sex—the pinnacle of masculine, feminine and neuter. Everything that he, she and it can ever want… a deadly, winking, sniggering, snuggling, chromium-plated, scent-impregnated, luminous, quivering, giggling, fruit-flavoured, mincing, ice-covered heap of mother love", a description which strongly suggested that he was homosexual.

Liberace sent a telegram that read: "What you said hurt me very much. I cried all the way to the bank." He sued the newspaper for libel, testifying in a London court that he was not homosexual and that he had never taken part in homosexual acts. He was represented in court by one of the great barristers of the period, 75-year-old Gilbert Beyfus, QC. They won the suit, partly on the basis of Connor's use of the derogatory expression "fruit-flavoured". The case partly hinged on whether Connor knew that 'fruit' was American slang implying that an individual is a homosexual. After a three-week civil trial, a jury ruled in Liberace's favor on June 16, 1959, and awarded him £8,000 (around $22,400) in damages (worth about £ or $ today) which led Liberace to repeat the catchphrase to reporters: "I cried all the way to the bank!" Liberace's popularization of the phrase inspired the title Crying All the Way to the Bank, for a detailed report of the trial based on transcripts, court reports, and interviews, by the former Daily Mirror journalist Revel Barker.

Liberace sued and settled a similar case in the United States against Confidential. Rumors and gossip magazines frequently implied that Liberace was homosexual throughout his career, which he continued to vehemently deny. A typical issue of Confidential in 1957 shouted, "Why Liberace's Theme Song Should Be 'Mad About the Boy!'"

In 1982, Scott Thorson, Liberace's 22-year-old former chauffeur and alleged live-in lover of five years, sued the pianist for $113 million in palimony after he was dismissed by Liberace. Liberace continued to deny that he was homosexual, and during court depositions in 1984, he insisted that Thorson was never his lover. The case was settled out of court in 1986, with Thorson receiving a $75,000 cash settlement, plus three cars and three pet dogs worth another $20,000. Thorson stated after Liberace's death that he settled because he knew that Liberace was dying and that he had intended to sue based on conversion of property rather than palimony. He later attested that Liberace was a "boring guy" in his private life and mostly preferred to spend his free time cooking, decorating, and playing with his dogs, and that he never played the piano outside of his public performances. According to Thorson: "He (Liberace) had several decorated, ornamental pianos in the various rooms of his house, but he never played them."

Because Liberace never publicly acknowledged that he was gay, knowledge of his true sexuality was muddled by stories of his friendships and romantic links with women. He further obscured his sexuality in articles like "Mature Women Are Best: TV's Top Pianist Reveals What Kind of Woman He'd Marry".

In a 2011 interview, actress and close friend Betty White confirmed that Liberace was indeed gay and that she was often used as a "beard" by his managers to counter public rumors of the musician's homosexuality.

Illness and death
Liberace was secretly diagnosed HIV positive in August 1985 by his private physician in Las Vegas. Aside from his long-term manager, Seymour Heller, and a few family members and associates, Liberace kept his terminal illness a secret until the day he died and did not seek medical treatment. Scott Thorson remarked that he was not aware that Liberace had any health issues prior to acquired immunodeficiency syndrome (AIDS) and up until one year before his death that "he was in overall excellent shape for his age; barrel-chested and powerfully built."

In August 1986, during one of his last interviews, with the TV news program Good Morning America, Liberace hinted of his failing health when he remarked, "How can you enjoy life if you don't have your health?" He was hospitalized for pneumonia from January 23 to January 27, 1987, at the Palm Springs county hospital.

At the age of 67, Liberace died the morning of February 4, 1987, at his retreat home in Palm Springs, California. A devout Roman Catholic to the end, he had a priest administer the last rites to him the day before his death.

At the time of Liberace's death, his press agent said he had died of pernicious anemia, emphysema, and heart disease.<ref>"Liberace dies, 67". Burton Mail. February 5, 1987. p. 2.</ref> Liberace's physician, Ronald Daniels, said he had died of heart failure caused by subacute encephalopathy, a degenerative brain disease."Liberace AIDS confirmed". The Pittsburgh Press. February 10, 1987. The Riverside County coroner performed an autopsy and determined that Liberace's cause of death was cytomegalovirus pneumonia, a frequent cause of death in people with AIDS. The coroner also determined that, at the time of his death, Liberace was HIV-positive, had pulmonary heart disease, and calcification of a heart valve. The coroner said that Liberace's doctor had deliberatively claimed a false cause of death, as heart failure is never caused by encephalopathy. Author Darden Asbury Pyron wrote that Liberace had been HIV-positive and symptomatic from 1985 until his death.

Cary James Wyman, his alleged lover of seven years, had HIV and died in May 1997 at age 34. Another alleged lover, Chris Adler, came forward after Liberace's death and claimed that Liberace had infected him with HIV. Adler died in 1990 at age 30.

Liberace's body is entombed along with those of his mother and brother at Forest Lawn, Hollywood Hills Cemetery in Los Angeles. In 1994, the Palm Springs Walk of Stars dedicated a Golden Palm Star to him.

Awards
Liberace was recognized during his career with two Emmy Awards, six gold albums, and two stars on the Hollywood Walk of Fame.Thornton, Diane S. (January 28, 1996). "Liberace's legacy: He's still drawing fans". The San Francisco Examiner. p. T3.

Liberace performed 56 sold-out shows at Radio City Music Hall, which set box-office records a few months before his death.

Closure of Liberace Museum and Tivoli Gardens Restaurant
In October 2010, the Liberace Museum in Las Vegas closed after 31 years of being open to the public. In June 2011, Liberace's Tivoli Gardens Restaurant, then operated by Carluccio's, closed its location next to the museum and relocated elsewhere. According to Liberace Foundation President Jack Rappaport, the museum had been in negotiations with money interests on the Las Vegas strip to relocate the museum but were unsuccessful. The Liberace Foundation, which provides college scholarships to up-and-coming performers, continued to function.

In January 2013, the Liberace Foundation announced plans to relocate the museum to downtown Las Vegas, with a targeted opening date of 2014. In 2014, however, Liberace Foundation chairman Jonathan Warren announced that the deal for the new museum had failed.

As of April 7, 2016, Liberace's cars are on display, as well as a piano and several costumes, at the Liberace Garage,  located in Las Vegas.

Depiction in media

 The 1952 Academy Award winning MGM Tom and Jerry cartoon "Johann Mouse" has Tom channelling Liberace in the final scenes at the Imperial Palace, including a giant candelabra and a smiling direct take into the camera, breaking the fourth wall.
 The 1955 Warner Bros. cartoon Hyde and Hare has Bugs Bunny playing piano as a Liberace-like character and, saying, "I wish my brother George was here."
 In the 1957 Warner Bros. cartoon The Three Little Bops, the piano-playing pig imitates Liberace, saying, "I wish my brother George was here."
 Also in 1957, Billy Barty parodied Liberace on an episode of The Spike Jones Show by playing "I'm in the Mood for Love" on a miniature piano bedecked with tiny candelabra that spouted milk.
 In 1981, Canadian sketch comedy series SCTV aired two skits with Dave Thomas playing Liberace. In the first, Liberace was a guest on The Merv Griffin Show alongside Yasser Arafat and Lou Ferrigno. In the second, a Christmas episode, Liberace performs "Good King Wenceslas" while Orson Welles (John Candy) repeatedly flubs his narration. 
 On October 2, 1988, a television film titled Liberace aired on ABC, starring Andrew Robinson as Liberace, Rue McClanahan as his mother Frances Liberace, John Rubinstein, Maris Valainis as Scott Thorson, Deborah Goodrich, Louis Giambalvo, and Kario Salem; the film had the distinct advantage of using Liberace's musical arrangements and recordings, and even some of his costumes and jewelry, but was evasive about his sexuality.
 On October 9, 1988, a Canadian–US television film biography, Liberace: Behind the Music, was aired on CBS. Victor Garber played Liberace, while Saul Rubinek played Seymour Heller, his manager (and a major consultant to the film). Maureen Stapleton played his mother Frances and Michael Dolan appeared as Scott Thorson. This film used some of Liberace's stage furnishings and was rather candid about his homosexuality.
 In The Ren & Stimpy Show episode "Sammy and Me" from 1996, Liberace is parodied in the form of a piano-playing roach named "Liberoache". He is seen playing piano for Sammy Mantis Jr. (a parody of Sammy Davis Jr.) who sings his trademark song "The Mantid Man". After they're finished, Liberoache reveals his desire for Sammy Mantis to bite his head off (possibly a reference to Liberace's homosexuality), to which Sammy obliges after peer pressure from fans.
 Liberace: Live from Heaven, a play imagining the entertainer's heavenly "trial" following death, began on stage in early 2010. The show featured the voices of Bobby Crush as Liberace, Stephen Fry as Saint Peter, and Victoria Wood as God.
 Behind the Candelabra, a film adaptation of Scott Thorson's autobiography, debuted on HBO in May 2013. Michael Douglas stars as Liberace, with Matt Damon playing Thorson, in a story centered on the relationship the two shared and its aftermath. His mother Frances was played by Debbie Reynolds, who knew Liberace as a friend during his lifetime. In the early 2000s, Warren Beatty was interested in directing, writing and producing a film based on Thorson's autobiography. Beatty initially wanted Robin Williams as Liberace and Justin Timberlake as Thorson. The project never materialized.
 Also in 2013, Bill Murray appeared dressed as Liberace for the 20th anniversary of The Late Show with David Letterman.
 The Jim Gaffigan Show, in 2016, licensed the likeness of Liberace as well as the use of a costume made for the HBO film Behind the Candelabra, from the Liberace Foundation, for an episode of the series which featured Michael Ian Black as Liberace.
 Mozart in the Jungle, an Amazon original series, licensed the likeness of Liberace as well as the use of a costume made for the HBO film Behind the Candelabra for appearances of Liberace in two episodes of season 4 of the show in 2018, according to Liberace Foundation Chairman Jonathan Warren.
 Family Guy: The Quest for Stuff, an app-based video game from Tinyco which is produced in cooperation with the writers of Family Guy licensed the likeness and voice of Liberace from the Liberace Foundation for his appearance as a game character in 2017, according to Liberace Foundation Chairman Jonathan Warren.
 Fred Armisen has portrayed Liberace in several Saturday Night Live sketches, most notably in "Vincent Price's Holiday Special" sketches alongside Bill Hader as Price.
 Blade Runner 2049, the 2017 sequel to the 1982 cult classic Blade Runner (both produced by Ridley Scott), licensed the likeness and music of Liberace for an appearance in the film which takes place in a dystopian Las Vegas, alongside fellow icons Elvis Presley, Frank Sinatra and Marilyn Monroe.
 Non-binary artist Dorian Electra plays a personal interpretation of Liberace in their music video "Flamboyant" (2019)

Legacy

At the time of his death Liberace was said to be worth around $110 million and to have bequeathed $88 million to the Liberace Foundation. The story was perpetuated by the officers of the Liberace Foundation often and as late as 2013. Only in 2015 did Liberace Foundation Chairman Jonathan Warren reveal in a lecture at the Mob Museum in Las Vegas that these figures were all part of the showmanship of Liberace, and that the real figures were closer to one tenth of those amounts.

The Liberace Foundation saw the sunset of its in-house endowment fund in 2011. University endowment funds provided by it continue to offer scholarships annually. The original Liberace museum closed its doors in 2010, citing the recession and an outdated, outmoded facility.

In November 2013, a dozen of Liberace's famous costumes, together with one of his stage cars and a piano went on display for a six-week period at the Cosmopolitan Las Vegas in an exhibition titled "Too Much of a Good Thing Is Wonderful", Liberace's unofficial motto, and an often-used one-liner from his act. The exhibition was extended by seven months.

Publications

Autobiographies
 Liberace: An Autobiography, by Liberace. Putnam and Co. Ltd, New York, 1973  (hardcover)
 The Things I Love, by Liberace with Tony Palmer (editor). Grosset & Dunlap, New York, 1976  (hardcover)
 The Wonderful Private World of Liberace, by Liberace and Michael Segell. Harper and Row, New York, 1986  (hardcover)

Biographies
 Crying All the Way to the Bank, by Revel Barker (Famous Trials) 2009 
 The Liberace Story, by Chester Whitehorn (editor). Screen Publications Inc, New York, 1955 (softcover – #4 in the Candid Profile series)
 Liberace: On Stage and Off, by Anthony Monahan. GRT Music Productions, Sunnyvale California, 1976 (hardcover)
 Liberace: The True Story, by Bob Thomas. St. Martin's Press, New York, 1987 (hardcover)
 Behind the Candelabra: My Life with Liberace, by Scott Thorson with Alex Thorleifson. E.P. Dutton, New York, 1988 (hardcover)
 Liberace: A Bio-Bibliography, by Jocelyn Faris. Greenwood Press, Westport CT, 1995
 Liberace: An American Boy, by Darden Asbury Pyron. University of Chicago Press, 2000, (hardcover) Read an excerpt.
 Liberace (Lives of Notable Gay Men and Lesbians), by Ray Mungo and Martin B. Duberman. Chelsea House Publications

Cooking
 Liberace Cooks, by Carol Truax. Doubleday, New York, 1970 (hardcover)
 Cookbook of the Stars, Motion Picture Mothers, Hollywood, 1970. (A collection of recipes by Hollywood stars including Liberace, Bing Crosby, Joan Crawford, Lana Turner, Katharine Ross, Mary Tyler Moore, Don Knotts, and more)
 Joy of Liberace: Retro Recipes from America's Kitchiest Kitchen, by Michael Feder and Karan Feder. Angel City Press, 2007 (hardcover)
 Delicious Recipes from Liberace's #1 Cook, by Gladys Luckie

Compilations
 The First Time: 28 Celebrities Tell About Their First Sexual Experiences, by Karl Fleming and Anne Taylor Fleming. Descriptions by Liberace, Debbie Reynolds, Art Buchwald, Erica Jong, Jack Lemmon, Loretta Lynn, Dyan Cannon, Joan Rivers, Dr. Spock, Irving Wallace, Mae West, and 17 others. Berkley Medallion, 1976 (paperback)
 Liberace Christmas Music: A Guide to Cassettes, Compact Discs, Music Scores, Piano Rolls, and Sound Recordings, by Karl B Johnson, John Carlson Press
 The Liberace Collection, 263 page Auction Catalogue jointly produced by Butterfield & Butterfield and Christie's, Los Angeles Convention Centre, 1988
 Liberace: Your Personal Fashion Consultant'', by Michael Feder and Karan Feder. Abrams Image, 2007 (paperback)
 "Liberace Extravaganza!", by award-winning costume designers Connie Furr Soloman and Jan Jewett is an opulent display of the renowned entertainer's dazzling and over-the-top costumes. HarperCollins, 2013 (hardcover)

Notes

References

Bibliography

Further reading

External links

 
 Liberace Foundation
 Liberace video footage after winning the case against the Daily Mirror
 Excerpts from Cassandra's column
 Transcript of CNN interview with Scott Thorson about his time with Liberace
 Yesterday's News: June 18, 1959: Liberace wins libel suit
 Greatest Songs DVD review and history of Liberace's syndicated television series.
 Liberace Museum To Close
 Pathe News Liberace Film Collection
 FBI Records: The Vault - Liberace at fbi.gov
 Collection of materials relating to Liberace. General Collection, Beinecke Rare Book and Manuscript Library, Yale University.
 Liberace recordings at the Discography of American Historical Recordings.

1919 births
1987 deaths
20th-century American male actors
20th-century American male singers
20th-century American male writers
20th-century American non-fiction writers
20th-century American singers
20th-century classical pianists
20th-century American LGBT people
AIDS-related deaths in California
American autobiographers
American classical pianists
American cookbook writers
American gay actors
American gay musicians
American gay writers
American jazz pianists
American jazz singers
American male classical pianists
American male film actors
American male jazz musicians
American male non-fiction writers
American male pop singers
American male stage actors
American male television actors
American people of German descent
American people of Polish descent
American pop pianists
American twins
American writers of Italian descent
Big band pianists
Big band singers
Burials at Forest Lawn Memorial Park (Hollywood Hills)
Catholics from California
Catholics from Wisconsin
Columbia Records artists
Deaths from pneumonia in California
Dot Records artists
Easy listening musicians
Jazz musicians from California
Jazz musicians from Wisconsin
Las Vegas shows
LGBT classical musicians
LGBT conservatism in the United States
LGBT people from California
LGBT people from Wisconsin
LGBT Roman Catholics
Gay singers
American LGBT singers
Male actors from Palm Springs, California
Male actors from Wisconsin
Musicians from Palm Springs, California
People from West Allis, Wisconsin
Singers from California
Singers from Wisconsin
Swing pianists
Swing singers
Traditional pop music singers
Wisconsin Conservatory of Music alumni
Writers from Palm Springs, California
Writers from Wisconsin